Ecnomiohyla sukia, the shaman fringe-limbed tree frog, is a frog in the family Hylidae.  It is endemic to Costa Rica.  It has been observed between 400 and 1000 meters above sea level.

This frog has extensive webbing on its feet.

References

Amphibians described in 2010
sukia
Frogs of North America